The 1950 UCI Road World Championships took place between 19-20 August 1950 in Moorslede, Belgium.

Events Summary

References

 
UCI Road World Championships by year
W
R
R